Pir Gheyb may refer to:
 Pir Gheyb, Fars
 Pir Gheyb, Hamadan
 Pir Gheyb, Kerman